Susie Lu is an American data scientist and the senior data visualization engineer at Netflix. She uses her knowledge of data visualization to present logical and graphical formats to help Netflix appropriately interpret user's data.

Life and education
Lu has been using her skills in data visualization at Netflix since April 2015. Lu obtained a Bachelor of Science in painting and industrial and systems engineering from the University of Washington in 2010. Lu has used these two different majors to allow herself to truly interact with data visualization in the most appropriate way. After school, Lu worked for Silicon Valley Data Science as a Data Scientist and Data Visualization Developer before she moved to Netflix.

Work 
In her free time away from Netflix, Lu works on data visualization projects. Currently, she is turning grocery shopping receipts into data visualizations that are unique and easier to understand. On this receipt, Lu divides it into a bubble chart and bar chart to better depict what areas of produce she is spending her money on. Lu bought a thermal printer to create receipts that allowed her to look at what categories of food she spent the most in. Outside of Netflix and her time spent working on data visualizations, Lu is a cartoonist and artist.

Awards 
Lu was nominated for a Dean's Medal in Painting and Systems Engineering from the University of Washington. Her biggest accomplishment, "all of the dashboards our team has made at Netflix in the last year. It’s so rewarding to build an application and have users tell us that it’s a delight to use. We’re helping the business get more out of their data than they ever have before".

References 

Wikipedia Student Program
Living people
University of Washington alumni
Women data scientists
Netflix people
Year of birth missing (living people)